Margareta-Caliopi Pogonat (6 March 1933 – 11 May 2014) was a Romanian theatre and film actress.

Pogonat studied at the Institute of Theatre and Cinematographic Art in Bucharest, graduating in 1959. She made her debut as a student in 1957, and then acted in theaters in Botoşani, Iaşi and Ploieşti. In 2009 she received a Lifetime Achievement Award from the Romanian Association of Theatre Artists.

Filmography

 Pasărea furtunii (1957)
 Două lozuri (1957)
 Lumină de iulie (1963)
 Amintiri din copilărie (1964) 
 Meandre (1967)
 Apoi s-a născut 'Legenda'  (1969)
 Tinerețe fără bătrânețe (1969)
 Orașul văzut de sus (1970)
 Dragostea începe vineri (1972)
 Drum în penumbră (1972)
 Papesa Ioana (1972)
 Zestrea (1972)
 Pistruiatul" (1973) -  TV series
 Când trăiești mai adevărat (TV)  (1974)
 Trei scrisori secrete (1974)
 Orașul văzut de sus (1975)
 Actorul și sălbaticii (1975)
 Gloria nu cântă (1976)
 Pasărea speranței (TV) (1976)
 E atât de aproape fericirea (1977)
 Regăsirea (1977)
 Clipa (1979)
 Convoiul (1981)
 Lumini și umbre: Partea I (1981) - TV series
 Lumini și umbre: Partea II (1982) - TV series
 Crucea de piatră (1994)
 Gaițele (1993) - film TV
 Binecuvântata fii, închisoare (2002) 
 Amantul marii doamne Dracula (2005) - TV series
 Cuscrele (2005) - (TV) - Rodica 
 Om sărac, om bogat (2006) - (TV) - Paraschiva Prodan  
 Margo (2006)
 Inimă de țigan (2007) - Tamara
 Regina (2008) - Afrodita
 Iubire și Onoare'' (2010) - Coco's grandmother

References

External links

1933 births
2014 deaths
Actors from Iași
Romanian stage actresses
Romanian film actresses